Prague Process may refer to:
Prague Process (Armenian–Azerbaijani negotiations)
Prague Declaration on European Conscience and Communism
Prague Process (co-operation in migration management)